Shared Services Canada (SSC) is an agency of the Government of Canada responsible for advancing, consolidating and providing information technology services across federal government departments. It was established in 2011 to combine digital services such as data storage that were at the time duplicated by each agency.

Mandate
The SSC mandate came into force 4 August 2011 as part of the passage of the Shared Services Canada Act, which established SSC as an agency responsible for consolidating IT Systems across the federal government. The Act provides for a minister to oversee the agency and report to Parliament, currently Helena Jaczek, the Minister of Public Services and Procurement.

SSC provides support for 44 separate Departments and Agencies across the Government of Canada.

Key initiatives
As part of SSC's mandate, a number of key projects were identified in order to consolidate and modernize the Canadian Government's IT infrastructure:

Email Consolidation Initiative
SSC is working to consolidate the email systems of its partner agencies which include over 550,000 mailboxes into a single system. The project has been met with multiple delays due to its large scope and complexity.

Data Centre Consolidation
SSC began the process of consolidating the Canadian Federal Government's approximately 800 Data Centres down to 7 newly designed Enterprise Data Centres (EDC). As of April 1, 2017, SSC has closed 92 data centers across the country and had begun to migrate applications to new EDCs located in:
 Borden, ON
 Barrie, ON
 Gatineau, QC
 Montreal, QC

SSC estimates that current legacy systems comprise over 56,000 m2 of Data Centre space, over 70 PB of computer data storage and over 14,000 applications.

Telecommunications Transformation Program
SSC is working to consolidate Canadian Federal Government Networks down from 50 separate Wide Area (WAN) Networks down to a single network for all departments. Another initiative is to consolidate Centrex phone lines through the use of VoIP and Mobile Phones. On 5 October 2017, SSC signed a $176M CAD contract with Telus to consolidate over 80,000 phone lines and expand desktop video conferencing and instant messaging.

Criticism
SSC has been criticized for slow service delivery and for putting the mandates of key federal agencies at risk due to poor support. Former RCMP Commissioner Bob Paulson criticized SSC for outages including access to key databases such as CPIC and for outages of the Agency's BlackBerry service.

In August 2016, Chief Statistician of Canada Wayne Smith resigned to protest the effects of Shared Services Canada on Statistics Canada.

References

External links
Shared Services Canada official website

Federal departments and agencies of Canada
Government of Canada